New Delhi is a 1988 Kannada-language action film directed by Joshiy and starring Ambareesh, Suresh Gopi and Sumalatha. It was produced by M.Sudhakar Reddy & M.Tirupathi Reddy of Samyuktha Productions banner and has music composed by Shyam. It is a remake of director's own Malayalam movie of same name (1987) whose story was loosely based on the novel The Almighty by Irving Wallace.

Plot
New Delhi is about a Delhi-based journalist who is imprisoned in a mental asylum after exposing the wicked side of two corrupted politicians, and his subsequent attempts at revenge with the help of his lady love. The story is loosely based on the novel  The Almighty by Irving Wallace. The film is the remake of highly successful Malayalam film under the same title New Delhi released in 1987. It was Suresh Gopi's first Kannada (Sandalwood) film.

Cast
Ambareesh 
Suresh Gopi as Suresh  
Thiagarajan as Nataraj Vishnu aka Salem Vishnu
Sumalatha as Vasantha
Urvashi as Uma

External links
 
http://ibosnetwork.com/asp/filmbodetails.asp?id=Newdelhi

1988 films
1980s Kannada-language films
Films scored by Shyam (composer)
Indian action films
Kannada remakes of Malayalam films
Films directed by Joshiy
1988 action films